Vega 2 (along with Vega 1) was a Soviet space probe part of the Vega program to explore Halley's comet and Venus. The spacecraft was a development of the earlier Venera craft. The name VeGa (ВеГа) combines the first two letters Russian words for Venus (Венера: "Venera") and Halley (Галлея: "Galleya") They were designed by Babakin Space Centre and constructed as 5VK by Lavochkin at Khimki. The craft was powered by large twin solar panels. Instruments included an antenna dish, cameras, spectrometer, infrared sounder, magnetometers (MISCHA) and plasma probes. The  craft was launched on top of a Proton 8K82K rocket from Baikonur Cosmodrome, Tyuratam, Kazakh SSR. Both Vega 1 and 2 were three-axis stabilized spacecraft. The spacecraft were equipped with a dual bumper shield for dust protection from Halley's Comet.

Venus mission 
The descent module arrived at Venus on 15 June 1985, two days after being released from the Vega 2 flyby probe. The flyby probe performed a gravitational assist maneuver using Venus, and continued its mission to intercept the comet.

Lander
The surface lander was identical to that of Vega 1 as well as the previous six Venera missions. The objective of the probe was the study of the atmosphere and the exposed surface of the planet. The scientific payload included a UV spectrometer, temperature and pressure sensors, a water concentration meter, a gas-phase chromatograph, an X-ray spectrometer, a mass spectrometer, and a surface sampling device. Several of these scientific tools (the UV spectrometer, the mass spectrograph, and the devices to measure pressure and temperature) were developed in collaboration with French scientists.  Since the probe made a nighttime landing, no images were taken.

The surface sample was found to be an anorthosite–troctolite rock, rarely found on Earth, but present in the lunar highlands, leading to the conclusion that the area was probably the oldest explored by any Venera vehicle. It transmitted data from the surface for 56 minutes.

Balloon

The cap and parachute were released 15 seconds later at  altitude. The balloon package was pulled out of its compartment by parachute 40 seconds later at  altitude, at 7.45 degrees S, 179.8 degrees east.

The probe crossed the terminator from night to day at 9:10 UT on 16 June after traversing . It is not known how much further the balloon traveled after the final communication.

Halley mission 
After their encounters, the Vegas' motherships were redirected by Venus' gravity to intercept Halley's Comet.

The data intensive examination of the comet covered only the three hours around closest approach. They were intended to measure the physical parameters of the nucleus, such as dimensions, shape, temperature and surface properties, as well as to study the structure and dynamics of the coma, the gas composition close to the nucleus, the dust particles' composition and mass distribution as functions of distance to the nucleus and the cometary-solar wind interaction.

During the encounter, Vega 2 took 700 images of the comet, with better resolution than those from the twin Vega 1, partly due to the presence of less dust outside the coma at the time. Yet Vega 2 recorded an 80% power loss during the encounter as compared to Vega 1's 40%.

After further imaging sessions on 10 and 11 March 1986, Vega 2 finished its primary mission.

Post Halley

A 6 million kilometer distant flyby of 2101 Adonis was considered but it turned out that Vega 2 didn't have enough fuel left to make the necessary orbital changes for the flyby. Instead the Vega probes took the opportunity to measure the dust as they passed through the orbits of 72P/Denning–Fujikawa, Biela's Comet and 289P/Blanpain.

Contact with Vega 2 was lost on 24 March 1987. Vega 1 had previously exhausted its attitude control propellant on 30 January 1987.

Vega 2 is currently in heliocentric orbit, with perihelion of 0.70 AU, aphelion of 0.98 AU, eccentricity of 0.17, inclination of 2.3 degrees and orbital period of 281 days.

See also

List of missions to Venus

References

External links
Vega 2 Measuring Mission Profile by NASA's Solar System Exploration
Vega mission images from the Space Research Institute (IKI)
Raw data from Vega 1 and Vega 2 on board instruments
Soviet Exploration of Venus
 Vega 2 Mission Comet Halley Data Archive at the NASA Planetary Data System, Small Bodies Node

Missions to Halley's Comet
Vega program
Derelict satellites in heliocentric orbit
1984 in spaceflight
1984 in the Soviet Union
Derelict space probes
France–Soviet Union relations
Extraterrestrial aircraft
Spacecraft launched in 1984
Extraterrestrial atmosphere entry